Flynn is a locality in Victoria, Australia, situated on the border of the City of Latrobe and Shire of Wellington. In the 2016 census, Flynn had a population of 180.

A railway station was established on the Gippsland railway line at what was then named Flynn's Creek  1880, and was renamed Flynn  1910s. It was destaffed in 1926 due to insufficient traffic and was closed permanently in the 1970s. A post office at the station opened in November 1880, was renamed Flinnstead on 1 July 1894, was renamed again to Flynn on 21 September 1926 and closed on 20 December 1968. A state school and store also once existed in the station precinct.

The Princes Highway runs through the locality. A new rest stop was built there in 2017.

The heritage-listed former Staplegrove Meat Works is located in Berkleys Road.

References

Towns in Victoria (Australia)
City of Latrobe